Angelov is a Bulgarian surname, it may refer to:

Masculine surname:
Angel Angelov (born 1948), former boxer from Bulgaria, silver Olympic medallist
Anyu Angelov (born 1942), Bulgaria's Minister of Defense
Atanas Angelov, Bulgarian sprint canoeist who competed in the mid-1990s
Darko Angelov, Macedonian diplomat with the Ministry of Foreign Affairs of the Republic of Macedonia
Dimitar Angelov (born 1979), Bulgarian professional basketball player
Emil Angelov (born 1980), Bulgarian footballer
Georgi Angelov (born 1990), Bulgarian football player
Ivo Angelov (born 1984), male wrestler from Bulgaria
Kostadin Angelov (born 1973), former Bulgarian footballer
Pano Angelov (1879–1903), known as Karabadzhakov, Bulgarian revolutionary in the Internal Macedonian-Adrianople Revolutionary Organization (IMARO)
Petar Angelov (military officer) (1878–1923), Bulgarian military officer, revolutionary in the Internal Macedonian-Adrianople Revolutionary Organization (IMARO)
Petar Angelov (handball) (born 1977), Macedonian handball player
Plamen Angelov, English engineer
Sasho Angelov (born 1969), Bulgarian football manager and former player
Stanislav Angelov (born 1978), a.k.a. Pelé, Bulgarian football player
Stefan Angelov (1947–2019), Bulgarian former wrestler
Timo Angelov (1882–1903), Bulgarian revolutionary, a member of the Internal Macedonian-Adrianople Revolutionary Organization (IMARO)
Todor Angelov (1900–1943), Bulgarian anarcho-communist revolutionary who lived and was active for a long time in Western Europe
Vasil Angelov (1882–1953), Bulgarian military officer and a revolutionary in the Internal Macedonian-Adrianople Revolutionary Organization (IMARO)
Yordan Angelov (1953–2013), Bulgarian former volleyball player who competed in the 1980 Summer Olympics

Feminine surname:
Anna Angelova (born 1971), Bulgarian fencer
Atanaska Angelova (born 1972), Bulgarian discus thrower 
Boyanka Angelova (born 1994), Bulgarian gymnast
Božena Angelova (born 1981), Slovenian violinist
Maria Angelova (1925–1999), Bulgarian Esperantist and author 

Geography:
Angelov (village), village in the municipality of Gabrovo, in Gabrovo Province, in northern central Bulgaria

See also
Angela (disambiguation)
Angeli (disambiguation)
Angelo (disambiguation)
Angelos